Ruby Moscoso de Young (22 September 1941 – 7 January 2022) was a Panamanian politician who served as First Lady of Panama from 1 September 1999 to 1 September 2004, during the presidential administration of her younger sister Mireya Moscoso.

She was born as Ruby Moscoso in Pedasí, Los Santos, into a family of six children. A graduate of the Justo Arosemena Institute, she married Dr. Carlos Young Adames. From 1990 to 1994, she served as Consul of Panama in Miami in the United States. 

Moscoso de Young died on 7 January 2022, at the age of 80.

References 

|-

1941 births
2022 deaths
First ladies and gentlemen of Panama
People from Pedasí District